Marcel Aubour (born 17 June 1940 in Saint-Tropez, Var) is a retired French international footballer who played as goalkeeper. He was the first choice goalkeeper for France in the FIFA World Cup 1966.

Titles
 Coupe de France in 1964 with Olympique Lyonnais and 1971 with Stade Rennais
 Coupe de France runner-up in 1963 with Olympique Lyonnais

References
 Profile on French federation official site
 

1940 births
Living people
People from Saint-Tropez
French footballers
France international footballers
Association football goalkeepers
Olympique Lyonnais players
OGC Nice players
Stade Rennais F.C. players
Stade de Reims players
Ligue 1 players
1966 FIFA World Cup players
Sportspeople from Var (department)
Footballers from Provence-Alpes-Côte d'Azur